Marinici may refer to the following places: 

 Marinici, Nisporeni, Moldova
 Marinići, Bosnia and Herzegovina
 Marinići, Croatia